Alexander Volkov or Aleksandr Volkov may refer to:

Alexander
Alexander Volkov (basketball) (born 1964), Ukrainian former basketball player
Alexander Volkov (fighter) (born 1988), Russian mixed martial artist
Alexander Volkov (writer) (Alexander Melentyevich Volkov) (1891–1977), Russian novelist
Alexander Volkov (tennis) (Alexander Vladimirovich Volkov) (1967–2019), Russian tennis player
Alexander Volkov (ice hockey) (born 1997), Russian ice hockey winger
Alexander Alexandrovich Volkov (politician) (1951–2017), President of the Udmurt Republic in Russia
Alexander Nikolaevich Volkov (1886–1957), Russian painter and teacher
Alexander Volkov, Israeli pianist and pedagogue, member of the Israel Piano Trio

Aleksandr
Aleksandr Volkov (ski jumper) (born 1978), Russian Olympic ski jumper
Aleksandr Volkov (volleyball) (born 1985), Russian volleyball player
Aleksandr Aleksandrovich Volkov (born 1948), Russian cosmonaut
, (1903–1975), Russian border guardsman and head of administration of the NKVD Usollag, 1939–1944

See also
 Alexandre Volkoff (disambiguation)